Granville Harcourt-Vernon (26 July 1792 – 8 December 1879), was a British politician.

Background
Harcourt-Vernon was the sixth son of the Most Reverend Edward Venables-Vernon-Harcourt, Archbishop of York, third son of George Venables-Vernon, 1st Baron Vernon. His mother was Lady Anne, daughter of Granville Leveson-Gower, 1st Marquess of Stafford. William Vernon Harcourt, Francis Venables-Vernon-Harcourt and Octavius Vernon Harcourt were his brothers.

Political career
Harcourt-Vernon was Member of Parliament for Aldborough between 1815 and 1820 and for East Retford between 1832 and 1847.

Family
Harcourt-Vernon was twice married. He married firstly Frances Julia, daughter of Anthony Hardolph Eyre, in 1814. They had several children, including Granville Harcourt-Vernon. After her death in February 1844 he married secondly the Hon. Pyne Jesse, daughter of Henry Trevor, 21st Baron Dacre and widow of John Henry Cotterell, in 1845. There were no children from this marriage. She died in March 1872. Harcourt-Vernon survived her by seven years and died in December 1879, aged 87.

See also
Baron Vernon

References

External links 
 

1792 births
1879 deaths
High Sheriffs of Nottinghamshire
Members of the Parliament of the United Kingdom for English constituencies
UK MPs 1812–1818
UK MPs 1818–1820
UK MPs 1832–1835
UK MPs 1835–1837
UK MPs 1837–1841
UK MPs 1841–1847